Suksayam Chanmaneewech (Thai สุขสยาม ชาญมณีเวช) is a Thai footballer. He plays for Thai League 2 clubside Samut Sakhon.

References

1985 births
Living people
Suksayam Chanmaneewech
Suksayam Chanmaneewech
Association football fullbacks
Suksayam Chanmaneewech